Doso is a language of New Guinea. It has 61% of its vocabulary in common with the nearly extinct Turumsa language, its only clear relative. It is spoken near Kamula but does not appear to be related to it; not enough is known to tell if it may be related to other languages in the area.

Vocabulary
The following basic vocabulary words are from Shaw (1986), as cited in the Trans-New Guinea database:

{| class="wikitable sortable"
! gloss !! Doso
|-
! head
| abaki
|-
! hair
| abuluso
|-
! ear
| apu
|-
! eye
| usa
|-
! nose
| bulu
|-
! tooth
| da
|-
! tongue
| ithi
|-
! leg
| sʌřei
|-
! louse
| amu
|-
! dog
| khasa
|-
! pig
| nɛna
|-
! bird
| sɩkĩ
|-
! egg
| wõnõ
|-
! blood
| omani
|-
! bone
| khi
|-
! skin
| bʌli
|-
! breast
| toka
|-
! tree
| gu
|-
! man
| haimo
|-
! woman
| dobo
|-
! sun
| khikha
|-
! moon
| ři
|-
! water
| umu
|-
! fire
| dɩki
|-
! stone
| kɔ
|-
! name
| samu
|-
! eat
| nane
|}

References

Doso–Turumsa languages